Susie Paallengetaq Silook (born 1960) is a carver, sculptor and writer, of Siberian Yupik, Inupiaq and Irish descent. She was born in Gambell, Alaska.

Life and career
Silook works primarily with walrus tusk ivory and whalebone, and selects for her subject matter images of women, including violence against Native women, rather than the more common depictions of animal motifs. She explores the realm of the fantastic in Yupik culture, working with ancestral ivory doll forms from her tribe on St. Lawrence Island.

She is an activist for Indigenous women and artists, building awareness around the cultural, legal use of walrus ivory and other media from the food sources of her people, which are slowly being banned in the United States due to President Obama's order banning elephant ivory in America. Highlighting the overreach of colonialist conservation in this disenfranchisement of the one of few resources available to communities still living harmoniously with their natural environment, she advocates for the rights of Indigenous People in conservation movements.

Silook's sculptures are in the Anchorage Museum, the Alaska Native Heritage Center, de Young Museum, and the Eiteljorg Museum of American Indians and Western Art.

Awards and recognition
 Governor's Award for an Individual Artist (2000)
 Eiteljorg Fellowship (2001)
 United States Artists Rasmuson Fellow (2007)

Bibliography
 Silook, Susie (2001). "Two Against the Arctic: My Summer as a 'Movie Star'". Alaska Geographic 28 (3): 62–65.  Silook describes her experiences appearing in Two Against the Arctic while an elementary school student in Nome.  The film, produced by James Algar and directed by Robert Clouse, was based on Sally Carrighar's Icebound Summer and aired on The Wonderful World of Disney in October 1974.
 Silook, Susie (2003).  "The Artist Napaaq: 1906-1971".  In Suzi Jones, Eskimo Drawings.  Chicago, IL: University of Chicago Press.  .
 Silook, Susie (2007) "Graveyard and Bubbles." The Alaska Quarterly Review 24 (1&2). Poetry.
 Silook, Susie (2011) "Ungipamsuuka: My Story." The Alaska Quarterly Review 28 (1&2). Memoir as Drama.

References

Further reading

External links
 Susie Silook review on Art Blat
 Silook, Susie. “Which Play to Write? She Listens to Her Native Voice.” LA Stage Time.com. LA Stage Alliance. June 14, 2011.

1960s births
Inupiat people
Living people
Native American sculptors
People from Aleutians West Census Area, Alaska
People from Nome, Alaska
Year of birth missing (living people)
Yupik people
21st-century Native American women
21st-century Native Americans
20th-century Native American women
20th-century Native Americans
American women sculptors
Artists from Alaska
20th-century American sculptors
21st-century American sculptors
Native American women writers
Native American women artists